Chameli Memsaab (English: Madame Chameli) is a 1975 Indian Assamese romantic drama film directed by Abdul Majid. A love story set in a tea estate in Assam, between a British tea estate owner and local tea garden worker. It starred George Baker and Binita Borgohain as leads. The film is based on a short story by journalist and writer, Nirode Choudhury.

The film was both a critical and commercial success, lead actor Baker turned into a matinee idol. At the 1975 National Film Awards, the film won the award for Best Music Direction for Bhupen Hazarika, as well as Best Feature Film in Assamese. In 2013, at the 44th International Film Festival of India, in Goa the film was shown as a part of "Focus: North East" section.

Plot
The film is set in a tea garden in Assam, where Berkeley (George Baker) is a British owner, he falls in love with Chameli (Binita Borgohain), is local girl who works in the tea estate. Subsequently, they marry, however later he is blamed  of her suicide.

Cast
 George Baker as Berkeley
 Binita Borgohain as Chameli
 Abdul Majid as Monglu
 Anil Chatterjee 
 Tarun Kumar

Soundtrack
Music of the film was given by Dr. Bhupen Hazarika.

Remake
This film was remade in Bangla and Hindi languages. The Bangla edition 'Chameli Memsaheb', directed by Indar Sen was released in 1978. The two main roles of this film were played by George Bekar and Rakhee Gulzar. In other hand, the Hindi 'Chameli Memsaab', directed by Ajit Lahiri was released in 1981.. The main roles were played by Mithun Chakraborty and Abha dhulia.

References

External links
 

1975 films
Indian drama films
Films set in Assam
Films based on short fiction
Films set in the British Raj
Tea industry in Assam
Best Assamese Feature Film National Film Award winners
1970s Assamese-language films
1975 drama films